Volmari "Vomma" Fritijof Iso-Hollo (5 January 1907 – 23 June 1969) was a Finnish runner. He competed at the 1932 and 1936 Olympics in the 3000 m steeplechase and 10000 m and won two gold, one silver and one bronze medals. Iso-Hollo was one of the last "Flying Finns", who dominated distance running between the World Wars.

As a youth, Iso-Hollo did skiing, gymnastics and boxing, and took up running when he joined the army. He was successful over distances between 400 m and marathon.

Iso-Hollo won his first Olympic gold medal in the 3000 m steeplechase at the 1932 Summer Olympics. He was denied a chance at the world record because the officials lost count of the number of laps – the lap-counter was looking the wrong way, being absorbed in the decathlon pole vault. When Iso-Hollo went to his last lap, the official failed to ring the bell, and the entire field kept on running, covering the distance of 3460 m. If the distance were 3000 m, Iso-Hollo probably would have broken the world record. He also won the silver in the 10,000 m.

In 1933, Iso-Hollo broke the 3000 m steeplechase world record, running 9.09.4 in Lahti and went to the 1936 Summer Olympics as a favourite. He won the steeplechase by three seconds, finishing with a new world record of 9:03.8, and earned a bronze medal over the 10,000 m. After the Olympics, Iso-Hollo fell ill with rheumatism but kept on competing until 1945. He died in 1969 aged 62.

References

Further reading

Wallechinsky, David and Kaime Loucky (2008). The Complete Book of the Olympics – 2008 Edition. London: Aurum Press, Limited. pp. 122, 169.

1907 births
1969 deaths
People from Ylöjärvi
Finnish male long-distance runners
Olympic athletes of Finland
Athletes (track and field) at the 1932 Summer Olympics
Athletes (track and field) at the 1936 Summer Olympics
Olympic gold medalists for Finland
Olympic silver medalists for Finland
Olympic bronze medalists for Finland
Finnish male steeplechase runners
Medalists at the 1936 Summer Olympics
Medalists at the 1932 Summer Olympics
Olympic gold medalists in athletics (track and field)
Olympic silver medalists in athletics (track and field)
Olympic bronze medalists in athletics (track and field)
Finnish Army personnel
Sportspeople from Pirkanmaa
20th-century Finnish people